Houghton Heights is an apartment located in the Houghton estates of Northern Johannesburg. It was designed by John Shaw in 1938. Houghton Heights is one of a number of imposing Art Deco buildings to have been built on the Orange Grove escarpment. Its design uses alternating red and orange bricks with richly decorated marbles.

References

Buildings and structures in Johannesburg